The Charleston Southern Buccaneers men's basketball team is the men's basketball team that represents Charleston Southern University in North Charleston, South Carolina, United States.  The school's team currently competes in the Big South Conference.

History

NCAA tournament results
Charleston Southern has competed in the NCAA tournament once, in 1997; the Buccaneers lost to UCLA 109–75 in the first round.

NIT results
Charleston Southern has competed in the National Invitation Tournament (NIT) twice. Their combined record is 0–2.

CIT results
The Buccaneers have appeared in the CollegeInsider.com Postseason Tournament (CIT), one time. Their record is 1–1.

References

External links
Team website